The James Cassidy House, located at 33 King Rd. in Park City, Utah, was built . It was listed on the National Register of Historic Places in 1984.

It was deemed significant as an example of the T/L cottage style, and may have been a T/L cottage formed by an addition. The T/L cottage by addition "resulted from the addition of a cross-wing to an existing hall and parlor house"; the style was "the most common and acceptable" way to enlarge Park City homes, and represents an important construction trend in the city.

References

Houses on the National Register of Historic Places in Utah
Houses completed in 1880
Houses in Summit County, Utah
National Register of Historic Places in Summit County, Utah
Buildings and structures in Park City, Utah
1880 establishments in Utah Territory